The 1910 Finnish football championship was the third edition of the Finnish football championship. Four teams participated in the final tournament, which was won by Åbo IFK.

Final tournament

Semifinals

Final

External links
 Results on RSSSF.com

Finnish Football Championship
 
Finland
Finland